The Neuquén grass mouse (Akodon neocenus) is a species of rodent in the family Cricetidae.
It is found only in Argentina. As of 2017, the IUCN synonymizes it with Akodon dolores.

References

Akodon
Mammals of Argentina
Mammals described in 1919
Taxa named by Oldfield Thomas
Taxonomy articles created by Polbot
Taxobox binomials not recognized by IUCN